is a Japanese manga series written by Nobuyuki Fukumoto and illustrated by Kaiji Kawaguchi. It was serialized in Kodansha's seinen manga magazine Young Magazine Uppers in 1998, with its chapters collected in a single tankōbon volume.

Plot
Believing that he is about to die, Ishikura confesses to Asai that five years ago he murdered a fellow woman from the mountain club called , whose death was reported by media as an accident. Opportunely, Asai realizes that a lodge is right in front of them and carries Ishikura to the place, managing to survive, while waiting for help to arrive. However, Ishikura begins to regret his confession, and Asai, who senses this, begins to panic and fears that he will be killed too as he is aware of Ishikura's crime.

Publication
Written by Nobuyuki Fukumoto and illustrated by Kaiji Kawaguchi, Confession was serialized in Kodansha's seinen manga magazine Young Magazine Uppers in 1998. Kodansha collected its chapters in a single tankōbon volume, released on July 9, 1999; a shinsōban edition was released on January 23, 2001; and a bunkoban edition was released on December 12, 2007.

The series has been licensed in Italy by Panini Comics.

Reception
Shuichi Oguro of Kono Manga ga Sugoi! Web wrote that the series "exquisitely matches the extreme situation and abnormal psychology," praising the psychological depiction in the story crafted by Fukumoto. Ettore Gabrielli from Lo Spazio Bianco praised the series for its atmosphere and the tension between the main characters, commending as well Kawaguchi's artwork, recommending it to thriller fans.

References

External links
 

Crime in anime and manga
Kaiji Kawaguchi
Kodansha manga
Nobuyuki Fukumoto
Mountaineering in anime and manga
Psychological thriller anime and manga
Seinen manga